Malik Muhammad Amir Dogar (born 1 January 1972) is a Pakistani politician who had been a member of the National Assembly of Pakistan from August 2018 till January 2023. Previously, he was a member of the National Assembly from October 2014 to May 2018 and a member of the Provincial Assembly of the Punjab from 2008 to 2013.

Early life and education
He was born on 1 January 1972 in Multan.

He has the degree of Master of Arts in Political Science and Bachelor of Laws.

Political career
He was elected to the Provincial Assembly of the Punjab as a candidate of Pakistan Peoples Party (PPP) from Constituency PP-198 (Multan-V) in 2008 Pakistani general election. He received 24,908 votes and defeated Peerzada Mian Shahzad Maqbool Bhutta.

He ran for the seat of the National Assembly of Pakistan as a candidate of PPP from Constituency NA-149 (Multan-II) in 2013 Pakistani general election but was unsuccessful. He received 20,719 votes and lost the seat to Javed Hashmi.

He was elected to the National Assembly as a candidate of Pakistan Tehreek-e-Insaf (PTI) from Constituency NA-149 (Multan-II) in by-elections held in 2014. He received 57,972 votes and defeated Javed Hashmi.

He was re-elected to the National Assembly as a candidate of PTI from Constituency NA-155 (Multan-II) in 2018 Pakistani general election.

References

Living people
Punjabi people
Pakistani MNAs 2013–2018
Politicians from Multan
Punjab MPAs 2008–2013
1972 births
Pakistan People's Party MPAs (Punjab)
Pakistan Tehreek-e-Insaf MNAs
Pakistani MNAs 2018–2023